André Michel may refer to:
 André Michel (art historian), French art historian, teacher and curator
 André Michel (director), French film director and screenwriter
 André Michel (lawyer), human rights and anti-corruption lawyer and opposition leader in Haiti